The Toronto Accessibility Task Force on COVID-19 is a working committee created by the City of Toronto to reduce barriers to COVID-19 vaccine access for people with disabilities.

It advocates for the needs of people with disabilities and arranges special vaccination events to meet their unique needs.

Creation 
The task force was launched in March 2021 with a grant of $125,000 in an attempt to improve services to people with disabilities, who have historically been marginalized in the provision of healthcare services.

Mandate 

The task force's mandate is to:

Actions 
Soon after being formed, the task force recommended the immediate prioritization of the provision of COVID-19 vacations to people with disabilities who live in congregate settings or people who received daily care. The task force also recommended that the City of Toronto provide mobile vaccination clinics and priority booking systems for people with disabilities, and recommended working with developmental service agencies and supportive housing organizations.

The task force arranged special vaccination efforts for people with high support needs in November 2021, and January 2022.

Members 
 Wendy Porch, Executive Director, The Centre for Independent Living in Toronto
 Peter Athanasopoulos, Executive Director, The Ontario Spinal Cord Injury Alliance
 Simone Atungo, CEO, Vibrant Healthcare Alliance
 Susan Bisaillon, CEO Safehaven Project for Community Living
 Dr. Laurie Green, Physician, St. Michael's Hospital, Department of Family and Community Medicine
 Megan Henze, occupational therapist, Surrey Place
 Yona Lunsky, Director, Azrieli Adult Neurodevelopmental Centre
 Liviya Mendelsohn, Director of Accessibility and Inclusion, the Miles Nadal Jewish Community Centre; Artistic Director, ReelAbilities Film Festival
 Cathy Samuelson, Executive Director, North Yorkers for Disabled Persons
 Sandy Stemp, COO, Reena
 Laura Visser, CEO, PACE Independent Living

See also 
 COVID-19 pandemic in Toronto
 Inclusion (disability rights)
 Ontario COVID-19 Science Advisory Table

References

External links 
 Toronto Accessibility Task Force on COVID-19 official page

Disability rights organizations
Organizations established for the COVID-19 pandemic
Municipal government of Toronto